Sclerolobium densiflorum is a species of legume in the family Fabaceae.
It is found only in the Alagoas, Bahia, and Pernambuco states of Brazil. S. densiflorum has recently suffered from severe habitat declines and is ranked near threatened by the IUCN.

Sources
 

Caesalpinioideae
Flora of Brazil
Near threatened plants
Taxonomy articles created by Polbot
Taxobox binomials not recognized by IUCN